Raj Niwas (translation: Government House) is the official residence of the Lieutenant Governor of Puducherry. It is located in Puducherry's capital city of Pondicherry. The present lieutenant governor of Puducherry is Dr. Tamilisai Soundararajan. Once it was the official residence of the French Governors.

History

Le Palais Du governor now called the Raj Niwas is situated surrounded by the Rue Jawaharlal Nehru on the North, Rue De Rangapoule on the South and Rue Saint Louis on the East and Rue Francois Martin on the West with access from the north and south. The Governor’s House has a history of its own. Pierre Benoît Dumas, the French Governor for Pondicherry, laid the foundation for a Governor’s palace in 1738 but the palace had to wait for the arrival of Joseph François Dupleix to see its completion. When Jean Law de Lauriston took over Pondicherry in 1765 the town was completely in ruins. Within a short span of three years a whole new town sprang up on the ruins of the old - the Governor’s Palace and the administration offices on the north, the warehouses on the south, the military barracks on the east and west.

Architecture

The new House of the Governor was built on the former site of the Hotel de la Compaigne which was the origin of the present Raj Niwas. Initially, the Governor's House was built in the French Baroque style but it was destroyed in the year 1761 by the British. Later, the building was rebuilt in the Rococo style from 1766 onwards. The Raj Niwas was a rectangular, single storied structure running east to west with porticoes on either side of the flanked by two other rectangular wings on the east and west. It was later converted into a double storied House.

Features

Much later the Southern Verandas were subsequently widened and its frontage was beautified and given a face-lift. Since then the southern gate has been the official entrance of the Raj Niwas. The Governor’s palace provides accommodation for state as well as personal guests of the Governor and these suites are named after the various regions, namely Pondicherry, Karaikal, Mahe and Yanam.

Description

The Raj Niwas is beautiful within as it is on the outside .It has a valuable collection of ancient artifacts. The magnificent collection of crockery, brass and silver wares, crockery, delicate porcelain, coins, statues, crockery, vases, antique furniture, crockery and grand piano which adds a rich and regal ambiance to.

Eco-initiatives at the Raj Niwas

Eco-initiatives at the Raj Niwas are adhered to its daily functioning. An eco-initiative to reuse, reduce and recycle has been adopted. Conserving energy and resources is always a priority. The Raj Niwas kitchen always follows the mantra of serving local, organic food. Eco-friendly products are sourced from local producers and are used at Raj Niwas and provided for the guest’s. Under its green initiative, Raj Niwas supports local artisans and craftsman by ensuring that all gifts, mementos and decorative are sourced specifically from Puducherry.

See also
 List of official residences of India

References

External links 
 Official Website of Raj Niwas

Governors' houses in India
Buildings and structures in Pondicherry (city)